Section 21 may refer to:

 The nurses' section of Arlington National Cemetery, a US military cemetery
 Section Twenty-one of the Canadian Charter of Rights and Freedoms, concerning language rights
 Section 21 of the Housing Act 1988 of the UK, concerning a formal notice to quit — see Section 21 notice